Invisible is an EP from Philadelphia's Paint It Black. It was released by No Idea Records on April 2, 2013. It was the band's first release since 2009's Surrender.

Track listing
 "Greetings, Fellow Insomniacs" – 1:42
 "Headfirst" – 2:26
 "Props for Ventriloquism" – 1:38
 "Little Fists" – 2:07
 "D.F.W." – 0:34
 "Invisible" – 2:24

Personnel
Dan Yemin – vocals, guitar
Josh Agran – guitar
Andy Nelson – bass guitar, vocals
Jared Shavelson – drums

References

Paint It Black (band) albums
2013 EPs
No Idea Records EPs
Albums produced by Will Yip